Galya Novents  (1 July 1937 – 22 July 2012) was a Soviet and Armenian stage and film actress, one of the most prominent Armenian actresses of the 20th century.

Biography
Galya Novents was born on 1 July 1937 in Yerevan. In 1958, she graduated from Yerevan Institute of Fine Arts and Theatre.

The 42nd Venice International Film Festival gave her a special mention for Best Actress, which was not awarded.

In 2007, Novents was awarded the title of People's Artist of the Republic of Armenia.

She died on 22 July 2012 in Los Angeles at the age of seventy-five.

Filmography
 2001 Khent hreshtak 
 1992 Klamek ji bo Beko (as Galina Novenz)
 1992 Where Have You Been, Man of God? (TV Mini-Series) 
 1991 Blood 
 1990 Yearning 
 1989 Breath 
 1988 Tchanaparh depi Sasuntsi Davit 
 1985 Apple Garden 
 1985 White Dreams 
 1985 The Tango of Our Childhood
 1983 Cry of a Peacock 
 1982 Gikor
 1982 The Song of the Old Days 
 1980 A Piece of Sky
 1977 Nahapet
 1975 Here, on This Crossroads 
 1974 Sour Grape 
 1971 Heghnar aghbyur 
 1969 We and Our Mountains 
 1966 Barev, yes em

References

External links 

1937 births
2012 deaths
Actresses from Yerevan
Armenian stage actresses
Armenian film actresses
Soviet stage actresses
Soviet film actresses
20th-century Armenian actresses
21st-century Armenian actresses